O. Barlow Willmarth (1882-?), was the president of the Colorado Carnotite Company. The company was performing uranium mining in Colorado where the company extracted radium from the carnotite ore.

See also
Allen Hall (University of Pittsburgh)

References

1882 births
People from Colorado
Year of death missing